Hillbilly Rock is the fourth studio album by American country music artist Marty Stuart. It was released in October 1989 by MCA Nashville. It peaked at #19 on the Top Country Albums chart but failed to chart on the Canadian charts. It was certified Gold in both countries. The songs "Cry! Cry! Cry!", "Don't Leave Her Lonely Too Long", "Hillbilly Rock", and "Western Girls" were released as singles.

Content
Several songs on this album are covers or would later be covered by other artists. Johnny Cash's "Cry! Cry! Cry!" first appeared on his 1957 album With His Hot and Blue Guitar. "Me and Billy the Kid" was written and recorded by Joe Ely for his album Lord of the Highway and would later be covered by Pat Green and Kevin Welch and the Overtones. "Don't Leave Her Lonely Too Long" was covered by Gary Allan on his 1998 album It Would Be You.

Track listing

Personnel
Richard Bennett - electric guitar, acoustic guitar, 6 string bass
Paul Franklin - steel guitar
Glen Hardin - piano
Paul Kennerley - background vocals
Kostas - background vocals
Joey Miskulin - concertina
Ralph Mooney - steel guitar
Leland Sklar - bass guitar
Harry Stinson - background vocals
WS "Fluke" Holland - drums
Marty Stuart - lead vocals, electric guitar, mandolin, acoustic guitar
Billy Thomas - drums, background vocals

Production
Produced By Tony Brown & Richard Bennet
Engineers, Assistant Engineers: Dave Boyer, Mark J. Coddington, Marty Williams
Mixing: Chuck Ainlay
Overdub Engineers: Chuck Ainlay, Mark J. Coddington
Digital Editing: Milan Bogdan
Mastering, Master Tape Preparation: Glenn Meadows

Chart performance

Weekly charts

Year-end charts

Singles

Certifications

References

1989 albums
Marty Stuart albums
MCA Records albums
Albums produced by Tony Brown (record producer)
Albums produced by Richard Bennett (guitarist)